Petar Bošnjak (born 12 June 1974) is a Croatian retired football defender.

He retired from professional football in January 2009, after 10 years in Slaven Belupo, continuing his career in lower-league football clubs of his home county.

References

External links
Petar Bošnjak profile at Nogometni Magazin 

1974 births
Living people
Sportspeople from Virovitica
Association football defenders
Croatian footballers
NK Bjelovar players
HNK Suhopolje players
NK Slaven Belupo players
Croatian Football League players
Second Football League (Croatia) players